J. Herbert Coman (October 20, 1920 – July 13, 2009) was an American football player and coach. He served as the head football coach at the University of North Carolina at Asheville (then known as Asheville-Biltmore College) from 1947 to 1950.

Coman played college football at the University of South Carolina, lettering from 1940 to 1942.

References

1920 births
2009 deaths
UNC Asheville Bulldogs athletic directors
South Carolina Gamecocks football players
People from Canton, North Carolina
Players of American football from North Carolina